The 1901 Paris–Roubaix was the sixth edition of the Paris–Roubaix, a classic one-day cycle race in France. The single day event was held on 7 April 1901 and stretched  from Paris to its end in a velodrome in Roubaix. The winner was Lucien Lesna from France.

Results

References

Paris–Roubaix
Paris–Roubaix
Paris–Roubaix
Paris–Roubaix